Haggar can refer to:

 a former district of Bahrain (historical region)
 Haggar Clothing, an American manufacturer of men's clothing.
 Douglas J. Haggar (born ca. 1947), real name of Mr. Whitekeys, American musician/entertainer
 Mike Haggar, a character in the Final Fight franchise.
 William Haggar (1851-1925), film-maker and showman.
 Witch Haggar, a character in Voltron: Legendary Defender

See also
 Hagar (disambiguation)
 Hager
 Hagger